Takalak (Tagalaka, Da:galag) is a poorly attested, extinct Australian Aboriginal language of Queensland.

References

Thaypan languages
Extinct languages of Queensland